Tuna casserole is a casserole primarily made with pasta or rice and canned tuna, with peas sometimes added. The dish is often topped with potato chips, corn flakes, bread crumbs or canned fried onions. Tuna casserole is a common dish in some parts of the United States, often prepared using only nonperishable pantry ingredients.

History
Casseroles became popular in American households in the 1950s mainly because the ingredients were cheap and easy to find at the supermarket. A can of tuna, a can of vegetables, a can of soup, and a package of egg noodles becomes a prepared family dinner in around half an hour. Tuna casserole can also be frozen or refrigerated and then reheated to be eaten the next day. Tuna casserole is popular to take to potlucks, and may be taken to the home of someone who is sick or going through bereavement as a gesture of kindness.
While there are countless variations of tuna casserole, historically it is made with egg noodles, chopped onion, shredded cheddar cheese, frozen green peas, drained canned tuna, condensed cream of mushroom or cream of celery soup, and crushed potato chips. The cooked noodles, onion, cheese, peas, tuna, and soup are mixed in a baking dish, with the crumb topping and more cheese sprinkled on top, and then baked. 

In 2010, Bon Appétit featured a from-scratch tuna casserole recipe, developed by Molly Stevens and featuring leeks, fresh dill, and Gruyère cheese. Chrissy Teigen featured a tuna casserole recipe in her cookbook, Cravings, with her version including typical nonperishable ingredients such as canned tuna, cream of mushroom soup, egg noodles, cheese, and a potato chip topping, with her version also featuring jalapeño peppers.

Tuna Mornay
Also common in most parts of Australia this casserole is also called tuna mornay and served with a Mornay sauce (Béchamel with cheese added, resulting in a cheese sauce). Peas or corn are often added.

Tonnikalavuoka
Tonnikalavuoka or tonnikalapastavuoka, literally meaning "tuna pasta casserole", is a Finnish version of the dish. It is one of the most popular school meals. The primary ingredients are tuna and pasta, often with tomatoes and garlic included and shredded mozzarella sprinkled on top.

See also

Hotdish
Comfort food
Funeral potatoes
Green bean casserole
List of tuna dishes
Midwestern cuisine
Australian cuisine
Timballo

References

Tuna dishes
Casserole dishes
American seafood dishes